Sirsi Sadat is a town and a Nagar Panchayat in the Sambhal district of the Indian state of Uttar Pradesh.

Geography
It has an average elevation of 210 metres (688 feet).

Demographics
, the Indian census, Sirsi had a population of 64,345. Males constitute 52% of the population and females 48%. Sirsi has a literacy rate of 70%, which is above the national average: male literacy is 78%, and female literacy is 64%. In Sirsi, 19% of the population is under 6 years of age.

See also
Sambhal
Sarai Tarin
Mahatma Gandhi Memorial Post Graduate College
Government Degree College Sambhal

References

Cities and towns in Sambhal district